Narandia is a Union of Purbadhala Upazila in the district of Netrakona, Mymensingh Division, Bangladesh.

Demographics
Narandia Union is considered to be one of the most important Unions in Purbadhala Upazila, due in part to both its location and its size.

Markets

The following village markets are located within Narandia Union:

 Narandia Bazaar
 Hiranpur Bazaar
 Shahabajpur Bazaar
 Shaud kona Bazar
 Ghater Bazar
 Dailer Bazar
 Vober Bazar
 SOYA Bazar
 Palima Bazar

Administration
The following villages are located within the Narandia Union:

 Narandia
 Yaron
 Narnarianpur
 Paikura
 Boulam
 Dulchapur
 Krishna Jeebon Pur
 Mohendrepur
 Sreepur
 Nijampur
 Shahbajpur
 Tulabaid
 Dhamdorvity
 Pailaty
 Vugi
 Jauany
 Shawod Kona
 Baboi Dohor
 Shaan kola
 Hobibpur
 Daponia-Shewra Dail
 Shawod Kona
 Khoshkoshia

References

Unions of Purbadhala Upazila